The 74th Regiment of Foot was an infantry regiment of the British Army from 1758 to 1763.

It was formed from the 2nd Battalion of the 36th Regiment of Foot and saw service in the British Expedition against Fort Louis. After the success of this expedition they were assigned garrison duty in Senegal. Subsequently they also saw service in the Jamaica during the Second Maroon War. They were disbanded in Jamaica in 1763.

Regimental Colonels
1758–1761: Maj-Gen. Hon. Sharrington Talbot
1761–1763: John Irwin

References

Infantry regiments of the British Army
Military units and formations established in 1758
Military units and formations disestablished in 1763
1758 establishments in England